Amaranthus tricolor, known as edible amaranth, is a species of flowering plant in the genus Amaranthus, part of the family Amaranthaceae.

The plant is often cultivated for ornamental and culinary purposes. It is known as bireum in Korea; tampala, tandaljo, or tandalja bhaji in India; callaloo in the Caribbean; and Joseph's coat in other areas, after the biblical figure Joseph, who is said to have worn a coat of many colors. Although it is native to South and South-East Asia, A. tricolor is one of several species of amaranth cultivated in warm regions across the world. Cultivars have striking yellow, red, and green foliage.

Amaranthus gangeticus 
Amaranthus gangeticus is considered a synonym of A. tricolor, but has been recognized as a separate species in the past. A. gangeticus is also known as elephant-head amaranth. It is an annual flowering plant with deep purple flowers. In Bangladesh, it has been used as a leafy vegetable. It may inhibit calcium retention in rice-based diets.

Culinary uses 

The leaves and stems may be eaten as a salad vegetable. In Africa, it is usually cooked as a leafy vegetable. It is usually stir fried or steamed as a side dish in both China and Japan.

China 

Korea 
In Korea, the plant is referred to as bireum. Small-leaved, reddish-stalked chambireum ("true bireum") is used as a namul vegetable in Korean cuisine. Considered a san-namul (wild green) that grows abundantly in the countryside, it tends to be foraged rather than planted and harvested. It has an earthy and nutty flavor, and goes well with both gochujang- and soup soy sauce-based seasonings, and bori-bap (barley rice).

In culture 
It appears on the coat of arms of Gonville and Caius College, Cambridge, where it is called "flowers gentle".

References

External links 

 PROTAbase on Amaranthus tricolor
 
 
 Amaranthus tricolor L. Medicinal Plant Images Database (School of Chinese Medicine, Hong Kong Baptist University)  

tricolor
Plants described in 1753
Taxa named by Carl Linnaeus
Korean vegetables
Namul
Flora of Malta